Dennis Bryan Cook (born October 4, 1962) is an American former professional baseball pitcher who played in Major League Baseball (MLB) with the San Francisco Giants (–), Philadelphia Phillies (1989–), Los Angeles Dodgers (1990–), Cleveland Indians (–), Chicago White Sox, Texas Rangers (1995–), Florida Marlins, New York Mets (–2001), and Anaheim Angels. He made his big league debut on September 12, 1988, and played his final game on September 18, 2002.

Cook graduated from Dickinson High School in 1981.  In college Cook was named to the All-Southwest Conference Team as an outfielder at the University of Texas in both 1984 and 1985.

Cook was a member of the 1997 World Champion Marlins, pitching in the World Series and was the winning pitcher in relief in Game 3.

Although not on the postseason roster, Cook was a member of the 2002 Angels team that won the World Series, defeating the Giants.

Although a pitcher, Cook was also a good hitter and he is number 2 on the list of Major League All-Time Best Hitting Pitchers between 1973 and 2003 (with 100 or more at-bats). His batting average was .264 (29-for-110) and he had two career home runs.

On February 1, 2010, Cook was announced as the Team Sweden's new head coach along with Scott Scudder in the coaching staff.

In 2018, Cook became the pitching coach for the Chatham Anglers of the Cape Cod Baseball League.

References

External links

Dennis Cook at SABR (Baseball BioProject)

1962 births
Living people
Major League Baseball pitchers
Los Angeles Dodgers players
Anaheim Angels players
San Francisco Giants players
Philadelphia Phillies players
New York Mets players
Cleveland Indians players
Texas Rangers players
Chicago White Sox players
Florida Marlins players
Baseball players from Texas
Angelina Roadrunners baseball players
Texas Longhorns baseball players
Clinton Giants players
Fresno Giants players
Phoenix Firebirds players
Shreveport Captains players
Albuquerque Dukes players
San Antonio Missions players
Charlotte Knights players
Scranton/Wilkes-Barre Red Barons players
Rancho Cucamonga Quakes players
People from La Marque, Texas
Cape Cod Baseball League coaches
Alaska Goldpanners of Fairbanks players